Fundu Moldovei is a commune located in Suceava County, Bukovina, northeastern Romania. It is composed of ten villages, namely: Botuș, Botușel, Braniștea, Colacu, Delnița, Deluț, Fundu Moldovei, Obcina Ursului, Plai, and Smida Ungurenilor. 

The commune was previously inhabited by a significant community of Zipser Germans (part of the larger Bukovina German community of Suceava County and Bukovina) during the late Modern Age up until the mid 20th century.

Late modern period history 

As it is the case of other former mining rural settlements from the countryside of Suceava County, Fundu Moldovei was previously inhabited by a sizable German community, more specifically by Zipser Germans (part of the larger Bukovina German community) during the late Modern Age up until the mid 20th century, starting as early as the Habsburg period and, later on, the Austro-Hungarian period.

Politics and local administration

Communal council 

The commune's current local council has the following political composition, according to the results of the 2020 Romanian local elections:

References 

Communes in Suceava County
Localities in Southern Bukovina
Mining communities in Romania